Pecos Bill is a fictional cowboy and folk hero in stories set during American westward expansion into the Southwest of Texas, New Mexico, Southern California, and Arizona. These narratives were invented as short stories in a book by Tex O'Reilly in the early 20th century and are an example of American folklore. Pecos Bill was a late addition to the "big man" idea of characters, such as Paul Bunyan or John Henry.

History
The first known stories were published in 1917 by Edward O'Reilly for The Century Magazine, and collected and reprinted in 1923 in the book Saga of Pecos Bill. O'Reilly claimed they were part of an oral tradition of tales told by cowboys during the westward expansion and settlement of the southwest, including Texas, New Mexico, and Arizona. But American folklorist Richard M. Dorson found that O'Reilly invented the stories as "folklore", and that later writers either borrowed tales from O'Reilly, or added further adventures of their own invention to the cycle.

Edward O'Reilly co-authored a cartoon strip with cartoonist Jack A. Warren, also known as Alonzo Vincent Warren, between 1929 and 1938. When O'Reilly died in 1946, Warren began a strip titled Pecos Pete. This was a story about "Pecos Bill", who had received a "lump on the naggan" that caused him amnesia. The cartoons originally were published in The Sun and were later syndicated. He also has a wife, named Slue-Foot Sue.

Pecos Bill made the leap to film in the 1948 Walt Disney animated feature Melody Time. He was portrayed by Steve Guttenberg in a 1985 episode of Tall Tales & Legends and by Patrick Swayze in Disney's 1995 film Tall Tale.

"Pecos Bill" was also the nickname of Civil War general William Shafter, although this was before O'Reilly created the legend. Shafter was considered a hero in Texas, and even had some legendary poetry written about how tough he was.

According to legend, Pecos Bill is responsible for creating many landmarks. One landmark he is said to have created is the Gulf of Mexico. Apparently, there was a drought in Texas that was so horrible, that Pecos rushed to California and lassoed up a storm cloud and brought it to Texas. It rained so much that the Gulf of Mexico was created. Another story is of him creating the Rio Grande River. He and his horse got stranded in the desert and needed water. So Pecos grabbed a stick and dug the Rio Grande River. One other landmark that he is responsible for is the Painted Desert. He apparently started shooting at a tribe of Indigenous Americans, and as they ran away, the ritual paint they had on them came off and painted the desert.

Description
According to the legend, Pecos Bill was born in Texas in the 1830s (or 1845 in some versions, the year of Texas's statehood). Pecos Bill's family decided to move out because his town was becoming "too crowded". Pecos Bill was traveling in a covered wagon as an infant when he fell out unnoticed by the rest of his family near the Pecos River (thus his nickname). He was taken in and raised by a pack of coyotes. Years later he was found by his real brother, who managed to convince him he was not a coyote.

He grew up to become a cowboy. Bill used a rattlesnake named Shake as a lasso and another snake as a little whip. His horse, Widow-Maker (also called Lightning), was so named because he was Texas's first and most notorious serial killer, leaving a trail of dead bodies clear across Texas (this is another version of how the Rio Grande was made). Dynamite was said to be his favorite food. It is also said Bill sometimes rode a cougar instead of a horse. On one of his adventures, Pecos Bill managed to lasso a twister. It was also said that he once wrestled the Bear Lake monster for several days until Bill finally defeated it.

Pecos Bill had a lover named Slue-Foot Sue, who rode a giant catfish down the Rio Grande. He was fishing with the pack when he saw her. Shake, Widow-Maker, and Slue-Foot Sue are as idealized as Pecos Bill.

After a courtship in which, among other things, Pecos Bill shoots all the stars from the sky except for one which becomes the Lone Star, Bill proposes to Sue. She insists on riding Widow-Maker before, during or after the wedding (depending on variations in the story). Widow-Maker, jealous of no longer having Bill's undivided attention, bounces Sue off; she lands on her bustle and begins bouncing higher and higher. Bill catches her, but then gets pulled with her. The town folks assumed both Bill and Sue were bounced away to another place or both ended up on the Moon where they stayed and were never seen again.

In Bowman's version of the story, Sue eventually recovers from the bouncing, but is so traumatized by the experience she never speaks to Pecos Bill ever again.

In a few other versions, Bill attempts, but fails, to lasso her, because of an interference by Widow-Maker who did not want her on his back again (or for that matter didn't want her coming between his and Bill's friendship), and she eventually hits her head on the moon. After she has been bouncing for days, Pecos Bill realizes that she would eventually starve to death, so he lassos her with Shake the rattlesnake and brings her back down to Earth. Widow-Maker, realizing that what he did to her was wrong, apologizes and is forgiven.

In other versions, Sue could not stop bouncing, and Bill could not stop her from bouncing either, so Bill had to shoot her to put her out of her misery. Though it is said that Bill was married many times, he never loved the others as much as Sue, and the other relationships did not work out.

In the Melody Time version, Bill was apparently responsible for the California Gold Rush and M.F. Stephenson's famous "There's gold in them thar hills" phrase. He knocked out the gold fillings of a gang of rustlers when they tried to steal his cow, scattering the fillings across the landscape. Bill also creates the Lone Star long before he meets Sue. Additionally, after Sue gets stranded on the moon due to Widow-Maker's interference in preventing Bill from lassoing her, a disheartened Bill leaves civilization to rejoin the coyotes, who now howl at the moon in honor of Bill's sorrow for Sue.

In the more popular versions, including many children's books, Bill and Sue reunite, and get married happily ever after.

In a school story book (leveled reader), Bill finds a tornado and lassos it, and then they reunite.

In Laura Frankos' short story "Slue-Foot Sue and the Witch in the Woods" (1998), Sue's bustle-ride deposits her in Russia, where she must fight a duel with Baba Yaga.

In the "Pecos Bill" episode of Tall Tales & Legends (1985), Sue is played by Rebecca De Mornay.

Sue does not figure in the 1995 Pecos Bill film Tall Tale; however, her fatal "bouncing to the moon" story is briefly narrated by Patrick Swayze's Bill, with Sue substituted by a man named Lanky Hank.

Appearances

Melody Time in 1948, Pecos Bill was the final segment of this Disney animated anthology film. This version of the story serves to explain why coyotes howl at the moon.
 Pecos Bill appeared in a 1985 episode of Tall Tales & Legends portrayed by Steve Guttenberg, and in the 1995 Disney film Tall Tale: The Unbelievable Adventures of Pecos Bill portrayed by Patrick Swayze.
In the story The Death of Pecos Bill, Pecos Bill is in a bar when a so-called city boy walks in with gator-skin shoes and a gator-skin suit, otherwise trying to present himself in the manner of an outlaw cowboy. Pecos Bill found it amusing and laughed himself to death outside.
 Comedian Robin Williams recorded a children's audiobook version of the story, with music by Ry Cooder, for Rabbit Ears/Windham Hill, in 1988.
Pecos Bill appeared in the children's book The Great Texas Hamster Drive by Eric A. Kimmel.
Harold W. Felton authored three books of Pecos Bill tall tales.
Pecos Bill appears in the PBS puppet television show Between the Lions, where he lassos a tornado.
Slue-Foot Sue is the heroine of Laura Frankos' sketch "Slue-Foot Sue and the Witch in the Woods", in the comedy-fantasy anthology Did You Say Chicks?!

See also
 Mowgli, a boy who is raised by wolves in The Jungle Book
 "Who Do You Love?" (Bo Diddley song)
 Baron Munchausen

Other "Big Men"
 Big Joe Mufferaw, a.k.a. Jos. Montferrand of the Ottawa Valley
 Gargantua
 Paul Bunyan
 Iron John of Michigan
 John Henry
 Johnny Kaw
 Mike Fink
 Hiawatha
 Joe Magarac
 Fionn mac Cumhaill
 Davy Crockett
 Venture Smith, the black Paul Bunyan
 Bill Brasky
 Alfred Bulltop Stormalong
 Buffalo Bill
 Wild Bill Hickok
 Crooked Mick of the Speewah
 Tom Hickathrift

Notes

References 
James Cloyd Bowman. Pecos Bill: The Greatest Cowboy of All Time. Orig. 1937, republished by The New York Review of Books, 2007. .
S. E. Schlosser. Pecos Bill. A few stories online.

External links

 
Literary characters introduced in 1917
Fictional American people
Fictional characters from Texas
Male characters in literature
Tall tales
Short stories set in the United States
Texas folklore
Fictional cowboys and cowgirls
Fakelore
Heroes in mythology and legend